Luce Township is one of nine townships in Spencer County, Indiana. As of the 2010 census, its population was 2,572 and it contained 1,147 housing units.

History
Luce Township was first settled about 1810; David Luce was among the first pioneer settlers.

Geography

Cities and towns
Richland City

Unincorporated towns
Enterprise
Eureka
Hatfield
Pyeattville
Sand Ridge

References

External links
 Indiana Township Association
 United Township Association of Indiana

Townships in Spencer County, Indiana
Townships in Indiana